Asplenium scolopendrium, commonly known as the hart's-tongue fern, is an evergreen fern in the family Aspleniaceae native to the Northern Hemisphere.

Description
The most striking and unusual feature of the fern is its simple, strap-shaped undivided fronds. The leaves' supposed resemblance to the tongue of a hart (an archaic term for a male red deer) gave rise to the common name "hart's-tongue fern".

Taxonomy
Linnaeus first gave the hart's-tongue fern the binomial Asplenium scolopendrium in his Species Plantarum of 1753. The Latin specific epithet scolopendrium is derived from the Greek skolopendra, meaning a centipede or millipede; this is due to the sori pattern being reminiscent of a myriapod's legs.

A global phylogeny of Asplenium published in 2020 divided the genus into eleven clades, which were given informal names pending further taxonomic study. A. scolopendrium belongs to the "Phyllitis subclade" of the "Phyllitis clade". Members of the Phyllitis clade have undivided or pinnatifid leaf blades with a thick, leathery texture, persistent scales on their stalk, and often possess anastomosing veins. Members of the Phyllitis subclade have undivided leaves with freely branching veins and single or paired sori. They are widely distributed through the Northern Hemisphere. Its closest relative within the subclade is A. komarovii, with which it forms a clade (the former segregate genus Phyllitis), sister to A. sagittatum.

One variety and two subspecies are currently accepted:
A. scolopendrium subsp. scolopendrium, is native to Europe and North Africa;
A. scolopendrium var. americanum, is native to the United States, Mexico and Ontario;
A. scolopendrium subsp. antri-jovis, is native to Greece, Crete and Turkey.

Morphological differences between the varieties are minor, but the North American variety americanum is tetraploid, while the Old World subspecies A. scolopendrium scolopendrium) is diploid.

Distribution
Asplenium scolopendrium is a common species in the Old World:
The subspecies scolopendrium occurs throughout Europe (including the Caucasus and the British Isles), the Middle East, and North Africa (in Morocco, Algeria, Tunisia and Libya, as well as the Canary Islands). It has also been introduced to the Falkland Islands. A. scolopendrium var. scolopendrium is rarely found in North America. Unlike its American counterpart, the scolopendrium of Europe is used for many horticultural uses.   Specimens of this variety found in North America (such as in New Brunswick and Ontario in Canada, and Maryland in the United States) are considered naturalized descendants of cultivated plants.
In North America, it occurs in rare, widely scattered populations located in different locales:
 in the Mexican states of Chiapas, Coahuila, Nuevo León, and Oaxaca, as well as the Caribbean island of Hispaniola. 
 along the Onondaga Limestone and Niagara Escarpment geological formations in Central New York (present in 2 counties), southern Ontario (present in 7 counties), and the eastern Upper Peninsula in Michigan (present in 2 counties). Exceptions are disjunct populations that exist in Alabama (in Fern Cave National Wildlife Refuge, a wildlife refuge centered around an off-limits cave in Jackson County, Alabama, where it has declined heavily due to illegal plant collecting, and an undisclosed pit in Morgan County that is also off-limits and protected), and Tennessee (in just a single county); these southern populations are at dire risk of extirpation. An introduced population descended from New York plants is found in New Jersey; it is a remnant of a 1936 effort to practice ex-situ conservation of populations in New York. 
 In 2020, a new population of hart's-tongue ferns was discovered inside a cave with basaltic lava flows in El Malpais National Monument, Cibola County, New Mexico; this represents the first confirmed population of the species in North America west of the Mississippi. Genetic analyses and surveys are currently being performed to determine the population's variation and overall health. 
The unique dispersal of Asplenium scolopendrium has caught the attention of international botanists. In fact, the very existence of such varieties beg that "...these populations arose following colonization events involving a single spore".

Habitat
The plants grow on neutral, calcium-rich, and/or lime-rich substrates under deciduous hardwood canopies (usually sugar maples in eastern North America), including moist soil and damp crevices in old walls; they are found most commonly in shaded areas. Plants in full sun are usually stunted and yellowish in colour, while those in full shade are dark green and healthy. The disjunct populations of the North American variation in the southeastern US are found exclusively in sinkhole pits or limestone caves. These populations may be relics of cooler Pleistocene climates.

Conservation

United States
In the United States, A. scolopendrium var. americanum was declared endangered by the U.S. Fish and Wildlife Service in 1989. The reasons for its rarity are currently being researched, with reintroduction programs in New York and elsewhere also in development.

Canada
Ontario, Canada has the highest population numbers of A. scolopendrium var. americanum of any region in the variation's distribution, with around 80% of all subpopulations and around 94% of all individuals. The fern was reported at more than 100 sites across the province, with around 75 still believed to be existing. Despite this, A. scolopendrium var. americanum was listed as  a species of Special Concern under the Committee on the Status of Species at Risk in Ontario in May 2017, due to its extremely specific habitat requirements, relatively small distribution, and some subpopulations consisting of too little individuals.

Europe
In spite of being much more common in Europe than in North America (and therefore present in more protected areas), A. scolopendrium is still declining in certain areas of the continent. The fern was listed as "Vulnerable" in the National Red Lists for Albania in 2014 and Norway in 2010 (under Criterion D1); considered "critically threatened and rare" in the Czech Republic's 2012 plant Red List; and "Endangered" in Sweden's 2010 Red List. However, it was not considered threatened in Germany's 1996 Red List of Threatened Plants. A. scolopendrium is protected by law in the Netherlands since 1998.

Uses

Cultivation
Asplenium scolopendrium is often grown as an ornamental plant, with several cultivars selected with varying frond form, including with frilled frond margins, forked fronds and cristate forms. The species has gained the Royal Horticultural Society's Award of Garden Merit, as has the cultivar 
'Angustatum'.

The American variety is reputed to be difficult to cultivate (making conservation efforts for it even more troublesome); due to this, most, if not all, cultivated individuals are derived from the Old World subspecies.

Herbal medicine
This fern was used in the 1800s as a medicinal plant in folk medicine as a spleen tonic (hence an archaic name for the genus, "spleenworts") and for other uses.

Gallery

References

Further reading
 Hyde, H. A., Wade, A. E., & Harrison, S. G. (1978). Welsh Ferns. National Museum of Wales. .
 A popular article on hart's tongue fern that includes several references and a discussion of cultivation possibilities for the European and American varieties. The article strongly discourages collection and or cultivation of the North American variety.

External links

 Commentary and video on Hart's Tongue ferns at Lynn Glen, Dalry, Scotland

scolopendrium
Garden plants of North America
Medicinal plants of North America
Plants described in 1753
Ferns of Europe
Ferns of Asia
Ferns of the Americas
Taxa named by Carl Linnaeus